The Unknown Ajax is a Regency romance novel by Georgette Heyer, set in 1817.

Plot

Hugo Darracott, a physically large young man, arrives at Darracott Place in Sussex to find his family waiting: his grandfather, Lord Darracott; his uncle, Matthew, a politician, his wife, Lady Aurelia and their sons Vincent and Claud; and his uncle Rupert's widow Elvira and her children Anthea and Richmond. It become clear that they are expecting a working- or at most lower middle-class man, and Hugo obliges them by adopting a Yorkshire accent and gormless appearance.

Lord Darracott puts pressure on his older grandchildren, Vincent, Anthea and Claud, to educate Hugo. He discourages Hugo from contact with Richmond, who is young and preoccupated with military matters. Richmond is Lord Darracott's favourite, and his grandfather does not wish to see him leave Darracott Place. All three of the older grandchildren agree: Vincent because his grandfather bribes him financially, Claud because he is a dandy and wishes to be influential, and Anthea to ease her grandfather's bullying of her mother.

It soon becomes apparent to Hugo that things are not straightforward at Darracott Place; among other things he is disconcerted by his family's positive attitudes to smuggling. He is also unimpressed by the financial status of the family: while the lands are clearly rich, the tenants' farms are poorly maintained, as are the family buildings, both Darracott Place itself and the Dower house which is reputed to be haunted and maintained by a single servant. It emerges that Richmond, bored with being kept at home with nothing to do, has joined in the smuggling. This results in a farcical scene when the family have to conceal this discovery from the customs officers, choreographed by Hugo, with Claud and Richmond pretending to be drunk and playing cards in order to deceive the main customs officer into not realising that Richmond, not Claud, is actually suffering from blood-loss.

Anthea, who is developing feelings for Hugo, is impressed by his inventiveness and strength, and is later appalled when Vincent reveals that, instead of being the impoverished man they had assumed him to be, as the son of a weaver's daughter and having earned his Commission rather than bought it, Hugo is in fact a Harrow-educated grandson and heir to a wealthy mill-owner, since she fears being considered a gold-digger.

Hugo feels this suggestion is ridiculous, and begs her to marry him to protect him from matchmakers, an offer which Anthea ultimately accepts.

Reception
Sheri Cobb South wrote that Georgette Heyer was "probably the greatest single influence on my writing", adding that "if my house caught on fire and I only had time to save one, I'd grab The Unknown Ajax on my way out. The humor is unsurpassed, and Hugo Darracott is such a wonderful hero!''

Footnotes

References

1959 British novels
Novels by Georgette Heyer
Historical novels
Fiction set in 1817
Novels set in Sussex
Heinemann (publisher) books
Regency romance novels
British romance novels